blackAcetate is a 2005 solo studio album by John Cale, his second and last album for EMI.

"Perfect" was released as a single in the UK two weeks after the album, and was subsequently included in The Sunday Times' list of the top 20 pop songs of the year.

Track listing
All tracks composed by John Cale

Personnel
John Cale − vocals, guitars, keyboards
Herb Graham Jr. − drums, programming, percussion
David Levita − guitars
Natalie Porter − background vocals
Musiic Galloway − background vocals
Jaspr Baj − background vocals
Mark Deffenbaugh − guitars, banjo
John Crozova − cello
Dustin Boyer − guitar, backing vocals
Joe Karnes − bass
Michael Jerome − drums, backing vocals
Charlie Campagna - atmospheres
Technical
Nita Scott - executive producer
Herb Graham Jr. - co-producer (tracks 1-8, 10-13)
Mickey Petralia - mixing engineer
Scott Gutierrez - assistant mixing engineer
Rick Myers - artwork, design (uncredited)

References

External links
 
 

John Cale albums
2005 albums
Albums produced by John Cale
EMI Records albums
Albums produced by Mickey Petralia